Cophes longiusculus is a species of hidden snout weevil in the beetle family Curculionidae. It is found in North America.

References

Further reading

 
 

Cryptorhynchinae
Articles created by Qbugbot
Beetles described in 1837